Bob White may refer to:

People
 Bob White (business executive) (born 1956), former Bain companies executive
Bob White (cricketer) (born 1936), former English first class cricketer
Bob White (footballer) (1902–1977), English footballer
Robert Michael White (1924–2010), known as Bob, American test pilot and astronaut
Bob White (fullback) (born 1938), American football player
 Bob White (geophysicist) (born 1952), Cambridge University professor of geophysics
 Bob White (ice hockey) (born 1935), Canadian ice hockey player
 Bob White (offensive lineman) (born 1963), American football center
 Bob White (trade unionist) (1935–2017), president of the Canadian Labour Congress and founding president of the Canadian Auto Workers trade union
 Bob W. White (active since 1998), Canadian associate professor of social anthropology
Bobby White (born 1926), American jazz drummer, see Earle Spencer
 Bob White (mayor) (1914–2006), mayor of Papatoetoe, Auckland, New Zealand

Other
 Bob White Oranges (designated 1993), American historic citrus packing house in Florida 
 Bob White, West Virginia, an unincorporated community in the U.S. state of West Virginia
 Bobwhite quail, a ground-dwelling bird of North America

See also 
 Robert White (disambiguation)

White, Bob